Kosner is a surname. Notable people with the surname include:

Edward Kosner (born 1937), American journalist and author
John Kosner (born 1960), American digital media executive, son of Edward

See also
Konner
Kostner